Daniils Turkovs (born 17 February 1988) is a Latvian former footballer.

Club career
As a youth player Turkovs played for Skonto FC academy, starting his professional career in 2007 with Olimps/RFS. During a period of three seasons Turkovs played 47 matches in the Latvian Higher League, scoring 9 goals. In 2010, he was one of several Olimps/RFS players brought to Skonto FC by the newly appointed manager Aleksandrs Starkovs. He scored 8 goals in 17 matches, helping the team win the championship. After the season Turkovs went on trial with the Hungarian Nemzeti Bajnokság I club Zalaegerszegi TE and signed a four-year contract with them in January 2011. Playing in Hungary for two seasons, Turkovs appeared in 26 league matches, scoring 6 goals. In March 2012 he returned to the Latvian Higher League, joining then champions FK Ventspils. During two seasons Turkovs played 57 league games and scored 23 goals. In 2013, he helped his club become the champions of Latvia and also win the Latvian Cup. After the season, he was included in the sportacentrs.com team of the tournament. On 9 December 2013 it was announced that Turkovs had joined the Polish I liga club GKS Bełchatów on a half-year contract.

International career
Turkovs has been a member of all youth national teams, including Latvia U-17, Latvia U-19 and Latvia U-21. He made his full international debut on 17 November 2010 in a friendly match against China, starting the game in the first eleven and being replaced in the 76th minute by Vladislavs Kozlovs. Currently Turkovs has 4 international caps, scoring no goals.

Honours
Skonto FC
 Latvian Higher League champion (1): 2010
FK Ventspils
 Latvian Higher League champion (1): 2013
 Latvian Cup winner (1): 2013

References

External links
 
 
 

1988 births
Living people
People from Jūrmala
Latvian footballers
Latvian people of Russian descent
Association football forwards
Latvia international footballers
Latvian expatriate footballers
JFK Olimps players
Skonto FC players
Zalaegerszegi TE players
Expatriate footballers in Hungary
Latvian expatriate sportspeople in Hungary
FK Ventspils players
GKS Bełchatów players
Expatriate footballers in Poland
Latvian expatriate sportspeople in Poland